Akbaşlar can refer to:

 Akbaşlar, Dursunbey
 Akbaşlar, İnegöl